Hvedekorn (Danish:Grains of Wheat) is a Danish language literary magazine published in Copenhagen, Denmark, since 1920. It is one of the Danish publications which improved the cultural journalism in the country.

History and profile
The magazine was established in 1920 under the name of Vild Hvede. 

Hvedekorn is based in Copenhagen and is a literary magazine, specializing in poetry. Danish poets Inger Christensen and Marianne Larsen are among the contributors of the magazine. The other well-known contributors include Tom Kristensen and Tove Ditlevsen.

Poul Borum, a critic and poet, served as the editor-in-chief of Hvedekorn. Another editor-in-chief was Torben Brostrøm. In 1996 Andreas Brøgger became its editor-in-chief.

See also
List of magazines in Denmark

References

1920 establishments in Denmark
Danish-language magazines
Literary magazines published in Denmark
Magazines established in 1920
Magazines published in Copenhagen
Poetry literary magazines
Quarterly magazines published in Denmark